Flight 967 may refer to the following commercial aviation accidents:

National Airlines Flight 967, explosion on 16 November 1959
Varig Flight 967, on 30 January 1979, it has never been found
Armavia Flight 967, crashed on 3 May 2006

0967